Ultimate Edition can refer to:

 Marvel Ultimates, a series of Marvel Comics editions
 Windows Vista editions, the Windows Vista edition
 Windows 7 editions, the Windows 7 edition
 Dead or Alive Ultimate, the Dead Or Alive video game compilation
 The Ultimate Matrix Collection, the Matrix Collection edition
 Ultimate Ghosts 'n Goblins, the Ghosts'n'Goblins edition
 Ultimate Dirty Dancing, the Ultimate Edition soundtrack for Dirty Dancing
 James Bond Ultimate Edition, the James Bond collection edition
 Unforgettable: Ultimate Edition, the Selena compilation
 Crazy Frog Presents More Crazy Hits, also known as "The Ultimate Edition"
 Superman Ultimate Collector's Edition, the Superman film series collection
 The Ultimate Collection (disambiguation)
 The Ultimate Anthology
 The Ultimate Edition, the boxed set by Klaus Schulze